No. 26 Squadron ( or LLv.26, from 3 May 1942 Le.Lv.26), renamed No. 26 Fighter Squadron (Finnish: Hävittäjälentolaivue 26 or HLe.Lv.26 on 14 February 1944) was a fighter squadron of the Finnish Air Force during World War II. The squadron was part of Flying Regiment 2 during the Winter War and Flying Regiment 3 during the Continuation War.

The unit was mainly equipped with Fiat G.50 fighters and obtained 52 aerial victories and suffered two losses.

Organization

Winter War
Detachment Heinilä (Osasto Heinilä)
Detachment Carlsson or 1st Flight of No. 24 Squadron (Osasto Carlsson or 1./LLv.24)
1st Flight (1. Lentue)
Detachment Siiriäinen (Osasto Siiriäinen)
Detachment Nieminen (Osasto Nieminen)
2nd Flight (2. Lentue)
Detachment Kivinen (Osasto Kivinen)
3rd Flight (3. Lentue)
Detachment Nieminen (Osasto Nieminen)
4th Flight (4. Lentue)
5th Flight (5. Lentue)

The equipment consisted of 10 Bristol Bulldog IVs, 9 Gloster Gladiator IIs, and 23 Fiat G.50s.

Continuation War
1st Flight (1. Lentue)
2nd Flight (2. Lentue)
3rd Flight (3. Lentue)

The equipment consisted of 26 Fiat G.50s, 1 Fokker D.XXI, 19 Brewster Buffaloes, 2 Hawker Hurricane Is, 3 Fokker C.Xs, 8 Polikarpov I-153s, and 1 Blackburn Ripon IIF.

Bibliography

External links
Lentolaivue 26

26